King Edward VII Hospital may refer to:

Bermuda
 King Edward VII Memorial Hospital, a hospital in Paget Parish

England
 King Edward VII's Hospital Sister Agnes (formerly the King Edward VII's Hospital for Officers), a private hospital in London used in recent years by members of the British Royal Family
 King Edward VII Orthopaedic Hospital, Sheffield, a defunct (since 1992) hospital in Sheffield, South Yorkshire
 King Edward VII Hospital, Windsor
 King Edward VII Hospital, Midhurst, West Sussex, formerly Midhurst Sanatorium. Closed in 2006 and developed into residential use.

Falkland Islands
 King Edward VII Memorial Hospital, a hospital in Stanley

Wales
 King Edward VII Hospital, Cardiff, the name of Cardiff Royal Infirmary between 1911 and 1923